The Adventures of Tintin is a series of comic albums by Hergé.

The Adventures of Tintin may also refer to:
 The Adventures of Tintin (film), a 2011 film by Steven Spielberg
 The Adventures of Tintin (TV series), a 1991–1992 TV series
 The Adventures of Tintin: The Secret of the Unicorn (video game)
 Hergé's Adventures of Tintin, a 1959–1963 TV series
The Adventures of Tintin: Breaking Free, anarchist parody of Tintin comics